James Smithies (bapt. 14 November 1819 – 27 May 1869) was an English co-operative movement organiser, wool-stapler, and local politician. In 1844 he was a founding member of the Rochdale Society of Equitable Pioneers.

References 

Rochdale Pioneers
British cooperative organizers
People from Huddersfield
Owenites
1819 births
1869 deaths